François Laruelle (born 22 August 1937) is a French philosopher, formerly of the Collège international de philosophie and the University of Paris X: Nanterre. Laruelle has been publishing since the early 1970s and now has around twenty book-length titles to his name. Alumnus of the École normale supérieure, Laruelle is notable for developing a science of philosophy that he calls non-philosophy. He currently directs an international organisation dedicated to furthering the cause of non-philosophy, the Organisation Non-Philosophique Internationale.

Work

Laruelle divides his work into five periods: Philosophy I (1971–1981), Philosophy II (1981–1995), Philosophy III (1995–2002), Philosophy IV (2002–2008), and Philosophy V (2008–present). The work comprising Philosophy I finds Laruelle attempting to subvert concepts found in Nietzsche, Heidegger, Deleuze and Derrida. Even at this early stage one can identify Laruelle's interest in adopting a transcendental stance towards philosophy. With Philosophy II, Laruelle makes a determined effort to develop a transcendental approach to philosophy itself. However, it is not until Philosophy III that Laruelle claims to have started the work of non-philosophy.

Non-philosophy

Laruelle claims that all forms of philosophy (from ancient philosophy to analytic philosophy to deconstruction and so on) are structured around a prior decision, but that all forms of philosophy remain constitutively blind to this decision. The 'decision' that Laruelle is concerned with here is the dialectical splitting of the world in order to grasp the world philosophically. Laruelle claims that the decisional structure of philosophy can only be grasped non-philosophically. In this sense, non-philosophy is a science of philosophy. Laruellean (non)ethics is "radically de-anthropocentrized, fundamentally directed towards a universalized, auto-effective set of generic conditions."

Reception and influence
A decade ago, he was described by Scottish philosopher Ray Brassier as "the most important unknown philosopher working in Europe today" and was described by Gilles Deleuze and Félix Guattari as "engaged in one of the most interesting undertakings of contemporary philosophy." The first English-language reception of his work (Brassier's account of Laruelle in Radical Philosophy in 2003) has been followed with a slew of introductions from John Ó Maoilearca (Mullarkey), Anthony Paul Smith, Rocco Gangle, Katerina Kolozova, and Alexander R. Galloway, as well as Brassier's own subsequent book, Nihil Unbound. 

Today, Laruelle's international reception is growing with dozens of titles a year translated and published in English by such publishing houses as Polity Books, Edinburgh University Press, Continuum, Palgrave Macmillan, Columbia University Press, Urbanomic/Sequence and others.

Selected bibliography
Articles translated into English
 François Laruelle, 'A Summary of Non-Philosophy' in Pli: The Warwick Journal of Philosophy. Vol. 8. Philosophies of Nature, 1999.
 François Laruelle, 'Identity and Event' in Pli: The Warwick Journal of Philosophy. Vol. 9. Parallel Processes, 2000.
 François Laruelle, 'The Decline of Materialism in the Name of Matter' in Pli: The Warwick Journal of Philosophy. Vol. 12. What Is Materialism? 2001.
 François Laruelle, 'The Truth According to Hermes: Theorems on the Secret and Communication' in Parrhesia 9 (2010): 18–22.
 François Laruelle, 'The End Times of Philosophy' in continent. 2.3 (2012): 160–166.

Philosophie I
 Phénomène et différence. Éssai sur l'ontologie de Ravaisson, Klinskieck, Paris, 1971.
 Machines textuelles. Déconstruction et libido d'écriture [Textual Machines: Deconstruction and Libido of Writing], Seuil, Paris, 1976.
 Nietzsche contra Heidegger. Thèses pour une politique nietzschéenne [Nietzsche contra Heidegger: Theses for a Nietzschean Politics], Payot, Paris, 1977.
 Le Déclin de l’écriture, suivi d'entretiens avec J-L Nancy, S. Kofman, J. Derrida et P. Lacoue-Labarthe [The Decline of Writing] Paris, Aubier-Flammarion, 1977.
 Au-delà du principe de pouvoir [Beyond the Power Principle], Paris, Payot, 1978.

Philosophie II
 Le principe de minorité [The Minority Principle], Aubier Montaigne, Paris, 1981.
 Une biographie de l'homme ordinaire. Des Autorités et des Minorités [A Biography of the Ordinary Man: Of Authorities and Minorities, trans. Jessie Hock and Alex Dubilet, Medford, Polity Press, 2018], Paris, PUF, 1985.
 Les Philosophies de la différence. Introduction critique [Philosophies of Difference: A Critical Introduction to Non-Philosophy, trans. Rocco Gangle, New York, Continuum 2010.] Paris, PUF, 1986. 
 Philosophie et non-philosophie [Philosophy and Non-Philosophy, trans. Taylor Adkins, Minneapolis, Univocal, 2013], Mardaga, Liège/Brussels, 1989.
 En tant qu'un. La non-philosophie éxpliquée au philosophes [As One: Non-Philosophy Explained to Philosophers], Aubier, Paris, 1991.
 Théorie des identités. Fractalité généralisée et philosophie artificielle [Theory of Identities: Generalized Fractality and Artificial Philosophy, trans. Alyosha Edlebi, New York, Columbia University Press, 2016], Paris, PUF, 1992.

Philosophie III
 Théorie des Étrangers. Science des hommes, démocratie, non-psychoanalyse [Theory of Strangers: Science of Men, Democracy, Non-Psychoanalysis], Kimé, Paris, 1995.
 Principes de la non-philosophie [Principles of Non-Philosophy, trans. Nicola Rubczak and Anthony Paul Smith, New York, Bloomsbury 2013], PUF, Paris, 1996.
 Dictionnaire de la non-philosophie [Dictionary of Non-Philosophy, trans. Taylor Adkins, Minneapolis, Univocal, 2013], François Laruelle et Collaborateurs, Kimé, Paris, 1998.
 Éthique de l'Étranger. Du crime contre l'humanité [Ethics of the Stranger: Of The Crime Against Humanity], Kimé, Paris, 2000.
 Introduction au non-marxisme [Introduction to Non-Marxism], PUF, Paris, 2000.

Philosophie IV
 Le Christ futur, une leçon d'hérésie [Future Christ: A Lesson in Heresy, trans. Anthony Paul Smith, New York, Continuum 2010], Exils, Paris 2002.
 L'ultime honneur des intellectuels [Intellectuals and Power, trans. Anthony Paul Smith, Malden, MA, Continuum, 2014], Textuel, Paris 2003.*
 La Lutte et l'Utopie à la fin des temps philosophiques [Struggle and Utopia at the End Times of Philosophy, trans. Drew S. Burk and Anthony Paul Smith, Univocal 2012], Kimé, Paris 2004. 
 Mystique non-philosophique à l’usage des contemporains, L'Harmat, Paris 2007.

Philosophie V
 Introduction aux sciences génériques [Introduction to Generic Science], Pétra, Paris 2008.
 Philosophie non-standard : générique, quantique, philo-fiction [Non-Standard Philosophy: Generic, Quantum, Philo-Fiction], Paris, Kimé, 2010.
 Anti-Badiou : sur l'introduction du maoïsme dans la philosophie [Anti-Badiou: The Introduction of Maoism in Philosophy], trans. Robin Mackay, New York, Bloomsbury, 2013, Paris, Kimé, 2011.
 Théorie générale des victimes [General Theory of Victims, trans. Jessie Hock and Alex Dubilet, Malden, MA, Polity, 2015], Paris, Mille et une nuits, 2012.
 Christo-fiction [Christo-Fiction: The Ruins of Athens and Jerusalem, trans. Robin Mackay, New York: Columbia University Press, 2015], Paris, Fayard, 2014
 En dernière humanité: la nouvelle science écologique [In The Last Humanity: The New Ecological Science], Paris, Cerf, 2015

See also
 Speculative realism

Notes

Further reading 
 Brassier, Ray, 'Axiomatic Heresy: The Non-Philosophy of Francois Laruelle', Radical Philosophy 121, Sep/Oct 2003.
 Brassier, Ray, Nihil Unbound. Enlightenment and Extinction. Edinburgh University Press, 2007.
 Erkan, Ekin, 'François Laruelle, A Biography of Ordinary Man: On Authorities and Minorities', Cincinnati Romance Review 46, Spring 2019.
 Galloway, Alexander, Laruelle: Against the Digital. University of Minnesota Press, 2014.
 Gangle, Rocco. François Laruelle's Philosophies of Difference: A Critical Introduction and Guide. Edinburgh: Edinburgh University Press, 2013.
 Rocco Gangle (Editor), Julius Greve (Editor), Superpositions: Laruelle and the Humanities, Rowman & Littlefield 2017.
 James, Ian. The New French Philosophy. Cambridge: Polity, 2012.
 Kolozova, Katerina. Cut of the Real: Subjectivity in Poststructuralist Philosophy. Columbia University Press, 2014.
 Kolozova, Katerina. The Lived Revolution: Solidarity with the Body in Pain as the New Political Universal. Evro-Balkan Press, 2010. 
 Mullarkey, John. Post-Continental Philosophy: An Outline. Continuum Press, 2006.
 Mullarkey, John, and Anthony Paul Smith, eds. Laruelle and Non-Philosophy. Edinburgh: Edinburgh University Press, 2012. 
 Ó Maoilearca, John, All Thoughts are Equal: Laruelle and Nonhuman Philosophy, University of Minnesota Press, 2015
 Smith, Anthony Paul. François Laruelle's Principles of Non Philosophy: A Critical Introduction and Guide. Edinburgh University Press, 2015.
 Smith, Anthony Paul. Laruelle: A Stranger Thought. Polity Press, 2016.

External links
 Organisation Non-Philosophique Internationale (ONPhI)
 Swami Narasimhananda, Review of Intellectuals and Power by François Laruelle, Prabuddha Bharata, 121/7 (July 2016), 578
 See Pérez, Rolando, "Intellectuals in an Age of Capitalist Nihilism," review of Intellectuals and Power: The Insurrection of the Victim, François Laruelle, in conversation with Philippe Petit in Radical Philosophy 193. September/October 2015: 60-62

1937 births
Living people
Continental philosophers
ENS Fontenay-Saint-Cloud-Lyon alumni
20th-century French philosophers
French male writers
Philosophers of nihilism
Heidegger scholars
21st-century French philosophers
École Normale Supérieure alumni